Berkay Şahin (born 29 December 1981) is a Turkish singer.

Berkay was a resident of İzmir from 1996, where he resided with his mother until 2009, after which he moved to Istanbul. Before releasing an album, he performed in Bodrum, Antalya, Çeşme and Kuşadası. He made his professional debut in 2010 by releasing his first studio album, tiled Ele İnat. The album was well received by the listeners, and a second album followed in 2012.

Berkay got into a brawl with Arda Turan in 2018 which ended with a broken nose for the pop singer. Turan appeared at the hospital with a gun, allegedly begging for forgiveness from Berkay, and panic ensued after the footballer fired the weapon at the ground. Arda Turan received a suspended sentence of 2 years and 8 months after being found guilty of firing a gun to cause panic, illegal possession of weapons and intentional injury. Turan will not serve his jail term if no further incidents occur for five years.

Discography 
Studio albums
 Ele İnat (2010)
 Aşk Melekleri (2014)
 Benim Hikayem (2015)
 Arabest (2016)
 Yansıma (2017)
 İz (2019)

Singles
 Aşk Sadece (2012)
 Doksana Bir Kala (2013)
 Uygun Adım (2016)
 Ey Aşk (2017)
 Ben Sadece (2018)
 İsyanlardayım (Ahmet Selçuk İlkan Unutulmayan Şarkılar, Vol. 2) (2018)
 Deliler (2019)
 Deli Et Beni (2019)
 İki Hece (2019)
 Kırgınım Ona (2020)
 Dert Faslı (2020)
 Yeter ki Sen İste (2021)
 Karnaval (2021)
 Yan (2021)
 Atma (Piyanist 2) (2022)
 Bal Badem (2022)
 En Güzelinden (2022)

Awards

References

External links 
 
 
 
 Berkay on Spotify

1981 births
Living people
21st-century Turkish singers
21st-century Turkish male singers